The Miss Nebraska's Outstanding Teen competition is the pageant that selects the representative for the U.S. state of Nebraska in the Miss America's Outstanding Teen pageant. The pageant is held each April in Omaha, Nebraska.

Alexandra Thompson of North Platte was crowned Miss Nebraska's Outstanding Teen on June 10, 2022 at the North Platte HS Performing Arts Center in North Platte, Nebraska. She competed in the Miss America's Outstanding Teen 2023 pageant at the Hyatt Regency Dallas in Dallas, Texas on August 12, 2022.

Results summary
The results of Miss Nebraska's Outstanding Teen as they participated in the national Miss America's Outstanding Teen competition. The year in parentheses indicates the year of the Miss America's Outstanding Teen competition the award/placement was garnered.

Placements
 4th runners-up: Morgan Holen (2015), Rose Chen (2022)
 Top 10: Steffany Lien (2016)
 Top 15: Phoenix Stanford (2020)

Awards

Preliminary awards
 Preliminary Evening Wear/On Stage Question: Brooke Ludemann (2012), Hannah Miller (2017)

Non-finalist awards
 Non-finalist Evening Wear/On Stage Question: Hannah Miller (2017)
 Non-finalist Interview: Hannah Miller (2017)

Other awards
 Outstanding Dance Talent Award: Morgan Holen (2015)
 Top 5 Interview Award: Hannah Miller (2017), Phoenix Stanford (2020)

Winners

References

External links
 Official website

Nebraska
Nebraska culture
Women in Nebraska
Annual events in Nebraska